In the siege of San Sebastián (7 July – 8 September 1813), part of the Peninsular War, Allied forces under the command of Arthur Wellesley, Marquess of Wellington failed to capture the city in a siege.  However in a second siege the Allied forces under Thomas Graham captured the city of San Sebastián in northern Basque Country from its French garrison under Louis Emmanuel Rey. During the final assault, the British and Portuguese troops rampaged through the town and razed it to the ground.

Situation
After winning the decisive Battle of Vitoria on 21 June 1813, Wellington's army advanced into the western Pyrenees to take the mountain passes and to face Marshal Soult's who had retreated back to France to try to reorganise his army. To clear his rear area, and to evict the last French forces from Spain, Wellington needed to take Pamplona and San Sebastián. Lacking resources to attack both simultaneously, Pamplona was blockaded and San Sebastián was put under siege.

The blockade of Pamplona took time, but resulted in the surrender of the French forces there due to starvation on 31 October 1813.

Forces

On 1 July General of Brigade Rey's 3,170-man French garrison consisted of the 22nd and 34th Line (1 battalion each), 62nd Line (2 battalions), elements of the 1st and 119th Line, one company each of sappers and pioneers, and two companies of gunners.  Seventy-six guns lined the fortifications.

To prosecute the siege, Lieut-Gen Sir Thomas Graham was given command of 9,000 troops from Maj-Gen John Oswald's 5th Division and Brig-Gen Henry Bradford's Portuguese brigade. Graham initially deployed 40 heavy guns from various sources.

Javier Sada has stated that the makeup of the allied troops investing the town included an important multinational share of soldiers of fortune, whose only incentive was the booty obtained in the conquered strongholds. According to Charles Oman (1902-1930), the 5th Division had 3,900 British officers and men and 2,300 Portuguese, with a further 2,300 Portuguese troops in Bradford's brigade. Marching strengths 25 May 1813, minus Battle of Vitoria casualties.

Approaches
San Sebastián (Donostia in Basque), had 9,104 inhabitants at the time and was more liberal than the surrounding conservative province of Gipuzkoa. The town was open to different influences from Gascony and France in the north and Spain in the south. Moreover, the make-up of the town had been conspicuously mixed ethnic Gascon and Basque since its foundation, although the Gascon language may have died out already by this point in the town's history.

After Napoleon's takeover in France, his elder brother Joseph I was proclaimed king of Spain in 1808. Francisco Amorós, who is cited in many accounts as "French-minded", was then appointed chief magistrate of the town. While it seems that the new authorities and aides were not held in especially high regard by the population, peace prevailed throughout the period up to 1813, and French troops were generally well accepted. This balance swung when French troops retreating under Emmanuel Rey's command and refugees fleeing Vitoria after the French defeat arrived in the city in June.

San Sebastián stands on a peninsula extending into the Bay of Biscay and runs generally north to south. The southern face of the city's fortifications was very strong with a large hornwork blocking the approaches with the higher town walls mounting guns that could fire over the hornwork to protect it. "it was the strongest fortification I ever saw, Gibraltar excepted", wrote William Dent. On its eastern side, the city was protected by the estuary of the Urumea River. British engineers detected a weak point near the riverfront at the city's southeastern corner. Assaults were possible across the river bed at low tide from both the south and the east. Breaching batteries could be placed south of the city and in sandhills on the east side of the estuary, which could themselves be protected from counterattack by the river.

British sea power could not be utilized because the Biscayan blockading fleet was understrength. French vessels regularly brought in supplies and reinforcements, while taking out wounded and sick soldiers. Because of this, Wellington could not expect to starve out the city. He would have to breach the walls and carry the city by assault.

First siege

The first objective was the capture of a convent, on high ground, south of the hornwork. Work started on 11 July on two batteries  from the convent, being completed and armed on the night of the 13/14 July. Continuous fire until 17 July reduced the convent to ruins, it was stormed and captured with no difficulties.

Fire was commenced and continued day after day against the town walls and towers until by 23 July three breaches had been made.

The captured convent was engineered to protect it from the north and batteries constructed to fire on the hornwork and town. On 20/21 July a parallel trench was thrown across the peninsular midway to the hornwork, where it was discovered that a large drain ran underground to the hornwork. It was decided to mine the end of the drain.

At dawn on 25 July an attack was launched. preceded by the explosion of the mine, troops would assault to hornwork mine breach and the two town wall breaches. The mine was exploded too early, when it was still dark, the troops attacked but could not get support from the artillery as it was too dark to see. The hornwork was assaulted but the follow up troops were late arriving and the advance party were beaten back. The troops assaulting the walls were exposed to fire for 300 yards across the tidal flats. Although they reached the top of the breaches, the supports were again slow and they were beaten back with great loss of life.

The British suffered 693 killed and wounded and 316 captured, including Harry Jones who was wounded while leading the forlorn hope. Rey's garrison lost 58 killed and 258 wounded.

The assault having failed the siege was reconsidered. Supplies of ammunition for the guns running low, and on the same day, 25 July, Wellington learnt that Soult had launched an attack (which would become the Battle of the Pyrenees). The decision was to postpone the siege pending receipt of more supplies by ship, and Graham was ordered to remove his guns to ships at Pasaia.

During the intermission, the garrison made several sorties, capturing 200 Portuguese soldiers as prisoners.

Second siege

After driving Soult back across the frontier, Wellington waited until the rest of the battering train and sufficient supplies of shot had arrived from England before he again turned his attention to San Sebastián: even with the increased resources now available to him, Wellington could only mount one formal siege at a time, whilst it was decided to plump for San Sebastian on the grounds that it was weaker, more accessible and open to resupply by sea. By 15 August the French commander, Rey had received some drafts from blockade running vessels but, even so, he only had 2,700 effective troops and 300 wounded in hospital.

On 19 August British supplies started to arrive, including additional engineering pioneers so that by 23 August the guns were ready to resume the offensive. By 26 August the British had established batteries for 63 pieces of artillery. On 26 August, 15 heavy cannon from the south and 48 guns from the east were blasting away, destroying towers and making more breaches in the walls.

The British then moved six guns from Surveillante on to the island to establish a battery to enfilade the town and the castle. The French were dismayed as they had thought the island's sides were too steep to assault.

In the south a sap had been pushed forward to the glacis of the hornwork.

Because the attack had to be made as the tide fell, it was scheduled for 11:00 am on 31 August. Another mine was exploded, which partly took down a wall, but also created a series of craters so that when the 5th Division made the assault from the south on the main breach. Again and again the men of the 5th Division rushed up the rubble-strewn breach, but they were cut down in swathes.

The French had built a coupure (inner wall) that stopped the redcoats from breaking through the defences. Hundreds of British soldiers were killed. Graham committed 750 volunteers from the 1st, 4th, and Light Divisions, but they were unable to push back the French defenders. A Portuguese brigade splashed across the Urumea River and attacked the eastern breach, but their drive also stalled. After two hours, the assault was a costly failure. The survivors hugged the ground to avoid the searing fire.

After consulting with his artillery commander, Alexander Dickson, Graham chose to open fire on the coupure's inner wall, despite the risk of killing many British soldiers who lay so close under the barrier. When the British heavy guns first fired over their heads, the survivors of the attack began to panic. But, when the smoke cleared, they saw that the big guns had wrecked most of the inner wall. With a yell, they charged, reached the top of the breach, and spilled into the city. At the sight of their defence lines broken, the French retreated to the fortress on the hill of Urgull and by midday the besiegers had taken over the town.

Rey and the rest of his surviving garrison held out until 5 September before asking for terms. The French commander formally surrendered on 8 September, and, in recognition of a noble defence, the remainder of the garrison stationed in the fortress was granted the honours of war by the Anglo-Portuguese forces. They marched out of the stronghold with shouldered arms, flags flying, to the sound of the drums. Their officers were permitted to retain their swords.

Ransacking and burning

On entering the town, the victorious British and Portuguese troops quickly discovered plentiful supplies of brandy and wine in the shops and houses, with many soon becoming part of a "reeling, riotous mob". Drunken and enraged at the heavy losses they had suffered, the troops ran amok, sacking and burning the city while killing an unknown number of inhabitants, but they may amount to 1,000. According to Australian historian Philip G. Dwyer, around half of the town's population was killed. Some British officers tried to put a stop the actions of the soldiers but were either ignored or threatened by the drunken soldiers, or turned a blind eye or joined them. Statements (75 reports) were gathered bearing witness to the events starting on 31 August. One of the survivors and witness Gabriel Serres claimed that, "[the assailants] committed the biggest atrocities, such as killing and injuring many inhabitants and also raping most of the women". The burning started that very night on some houses, according to local witnesses. Domingo de Echave, a local citizen, testified that he heard a British soldier pointing to flames coming out of a house and saying "See that house ablaze? Mind you, tomorrow all like this." The city kept burning yet for seven days, by which time only a handful of buildings survived. The rest of it burned to the ground— 600 houses, except for 30 in Trinity street, present-day 31 August, selected by the assailants to host the British and Portuguese command.

After the burning, the town council and many survivors of the destruction held a meeting in Zubieta, where the devastated town dwellers decided the reconstruction of the town almost from scratch. Since the previous council had collaborated with the French, a new council was appointed, and a letter was written congratulating Wellington on his victory and requesting him that they'd be granted sums of money for those most in need. The demand was not met since Wellington refused to do so, and wholeheartedly wished in the reply that he not be addressed again. He went on to attribute the sack of the town to the French, and on 2 November while he was in Lesaka Wellington denied any responsibility of the British troops on the burning of the city. In November a popular trial was arranged by the town council "on the atrocious behaviour shown by the British and Portuguese troops", where only two local women answered the questionnaire provided.

The burning of the town is remembered every year on August 31 with an extensive candlelit ceremony.

Consequences

Of Rey's original garrison of 3,170 plus some later drafts, 850 were killed, 670 had been captured on 31 August and 1,860 surrendered, of whom 480 were sick and wounded. Graham's command lost 3,770 killed, wounded and missing. In the final assault, 867 men died, 1,416 fell wounded and 44 were listed as missing. Maj-Gen James Leith, who had just returned to command the 5th Division, was wounded in the assault. The chief engineering officer who laid out the Lines of Torres Vedras, Sir Richard Fletcher, was shot through the heart and killed in the siege, as was one of Harry Burrard's sons.

Not realizing he was too late to save San Sebastián, Soult launched a final attack on 31 August. Spanish forces repelled this attempt in the Battle of San Marcial. With the possession of San Sebastián, Wellington could think about driving Soult back into France. The next action was the Battle of the Bidassoa on 7 October, followed by the Battle of Nivelle in November. The French garrison of Pamplona surrendered to the Spanish on 31 October.

Explanatory notes

Notes

References

Further reading

External links
 Memorial event in remembrance of the civilians massacred and women raped in 1813 as of August 31

Sieges of the Peninsular War
Sieges of the Napoleonic Wars
Sieges involving France
Sieges involving the United Kingdom
Sieges involving Spain
San Sebastian
1813 in Spain
July 1813 events
August 1813 events
September 1813 events
San Sebastián
Arthur Wellesley, 1st Duke of Wellington
Massacres in Spain
Massacres committed by the United Kingdom
Massacres in 1813